This is a list of flight simulator video games, including the developer, versions, and release date.

Notes 

 A flight simulator series is flagged as discontinued if the last series is released 10 years ago
 Falcon 4.0 is flagged as discontinued because its main developer is no longer maintain it

References 

General flight simulators
Timelines of video games
Video game lists by genre